The 1910 South Sydney season was the 3rd in the club's history. The club competed in the New South Wales Rugby Football League Premiership (NSWRFL), finishing the season as runners-up.

Ladder

Fixtures

Regular season

Finals 
Newtown  4 (Goals: Charles Russell 2)

drew with

South Sydney 4 (Goals: Jim Davis 2)

(Newtown finished as premiers as they had been minor premiers)

Club records 

On July 23, Souths recorded a 67–0 win over Western Suburbs in Round 8. This remains the club record for largest win margin in a game. It is also the largest win margin performed by Souths against a defunct NSWRL/NRL team (assuming the existing Wests Tigers are a separate entity to the Western Suburbs club).

References 

South Sydney Rabbitohs seasons
South Sydney Rabbitohs season